Apoquindo (Runasimi Apuk-kintu flowers for the deity) is the name of a river and pre-Columbian settlement located east of the city of Santiago de Chile, at the foot of the foothills, in the present town of Las Condes. This settlement later became known as the Pueblo de Indios in place names Apoquindo and transferred to an estate, the Mount Apoquindo, the Apoquindo Waterfall, the Apoquindo Avenue, to the district San Carlos de Apoquindo, the Apoquindo College and other geographical landmarks and urban community.

The limits of Apoquindo are: on the north by Mapocho River in the east of Sierra de Ramon with Provincia Mount and La Cruz Mount, south of Quebrada de Ramon and the western Los Domínicos Square. At present, these limits are not as formal as the Avenida Apoquindo extends much further west (Canal San Carlos) to the border with the municipality of Providencia.

Etymology 
Its name comes from the Quechua language, meaning in Quechua apuk-kintu Flowers for deity ”. While its name is directly related to the worship that was made in the Inca civilization Apu of  Mapocho Valley.

When the Incas conquered an area elected as Apu or the highest hill and this Apu a place of worship and sacrifice. Inca culture rendered the care and tutelage Apu the inhabitants of the valleys that were watered by their summits.
This Apu was Cerro El Plomo and was harvested Apoquindo the best flowers for worship, as well from which caravans departed Apoquindo were bound to Cerro El Plomo for the qhapaq hucha.

References

Bibliography 
Léon Echaiz, René, "Ñuñohue" Editorial Francisco de Aguirre, Santiago, 1972.
Ossandón, Dominga and Carlos Ossandón, Guide to Santiago, 9th edition, Editorial Universitaria, Santiago, 1995
Jaksic FM., Spatiotemporal variation patterns of plants and animals in San Carlos de Apoquindo, central Chile. Center for Advanced Research in Ecology & Biodiversity. School of Biological Sciences, Pontificia Universidad Católica de Chile. .

External links 
Mammals of the central Andes

Rivers of Chile
History of the Inca civilization
Rivers of Santiago Metropolitan Region